Jorge Neves may refer to:

 Jorge Neves (footballer, born 1969), Portuguese football player and coach
 Jorge Neves (footballer, born 1987), Portuguese football player